The men's 100 metres event at the 2003 Summer Universiade was held in Daegu, South Korea on 25 and 26 August.

Medalists

Results

Heats
Wind:Heat 1: +0.2 m/s, Heat 2: +0.6 m/s, Heat 3: -0.3 m/s, Heat 4: +0.6 m/s, Heat 5: -0.1 m/s, Heat 6: -0.4 m/s, Heat 7: -0.1 m/s

Quarterfinals
Wind:Heat 1: +0.8 m/s, Heat 2: -2.0 m/s, Heat 3: -0.1 m/s, Heat 4: +1.9 m/s

Semifinals
Wind:Heat 1: -0.1 m/s, Heat 2: -2.2 m/s

Final
Wind: -1.2 m/s

References
Results

Athletics at the 2003 Summer Universiade
2003